Adenosylcobinamide-phosphate synthase (CbiB) is an enzyme with systematic name adenosylcobyric acid:(R)-1-aminopropan-2-yl phosphate ligase (ADP-forming). This enzyme catalyses the following chemical reaction

 (1) ATP + adenosylcobyric acid + (R)-1-aminopropan-2-yl phosphate  ADP + phosphate + adenosylcobinamide phosphate
 (2) ATP + adenosylcobyric acid + (R)-1-aminopropan-2-ol  ADP + phosphate + adenosylcobinamide

One of the substrates, (R)-1-aminopropan-2-yl phosphate, is produced by CobD. This enzyme is part of the biosynthetic pathway to cobalamin (vitamin B12) in bacteria.

See also
 Cobalamin biosynthesis

References

External links 
 

EC 6.3.1